Pavković is a South Slavic surname. It may refer to:

Miljan Pavković (born 1981), basketball player
Nebojša Pavković (born 1946), general
Slobodan Pavković (born 1955), footballer

Serbian surnames
Slavic-language surnames
Patronymic surnames
Croatian surnames